Léon Darrien (25 October 1887 – 19 February 1973) was a Belgian gymnast who competed in the 1920 Summer Olympics. He was part of the Belgian team which won the bronze medal in the gymnastics men's team, Swedish system event in 1920.

References

1887 births
1973 deaths
Belgian male artistic gymnasts
Gymnasts at the 1920 Summer Olympics
Olympic gymnasts of Belgium
Olympic bronze medalists for Belgium
Olympic medalists in gymnastics
Medalists at the 1920 Summer Olympics